Hedwig Bilgram (born 31 March 1933) is a German musician and educator.

She was born in Memmingen. She studied piano from an early age and went on to study organ with Karl Richter and piano with Friedrich Wührer. In 1959, she won first prize at the ARD International Music Competition. In 1961, she began teaching at the University of Music and Performing Arts Munich in Munich and became a professor in 1964.

For many years, she performed with the Münchener Bach-Chor and Münchener Bach-Orchester under Karl Richter. She has been a member of the Berlin Haydn Ensemble since 1990. She has premiered works by Harald Genzmer, Henri Tomasi and André Jolivet.

References 

1933 births
Living people
German organists
Women organists
German harpsichordists
20th-century organists
20th-century classical musicians
20th-century German musicians
20th-century women musicians
21st-century organists
21st-century classical musicians
21st-century German musicians
21st-century women musicians
People from Memmingen
Academic staff of the University of Music and Performing Arts Munich